No Gods / No Managers is the only studio album and final release by American hardcore punk band Choking Victim. The album was released in 1999 through Hellcat/Epitaph Records and re-released on LP format by Epitaph in 2004. Being the sole full-length album of Choking Victim, (they broke up immediately after recording the album), it became hugely popular in the punk scene. It inspired many nascent bands, and the band members of Choking Victim went on to form other bands, most notably Leftöver Crack.

The tone of the album is largely dark and pessimistic, with lyrics and artwork containing Satanic imagery. The cover does not contain a barcode, in accordance with their staunch anti-capitalist message, and is decorated with various satanic and anti-Christian symbols. However, a later pressing includes a barcode on the back cover. The album's title is an interpretation of the anarchist phrase/motto "No gods, no masters".

The quotations heard on several tracks are recordings of Michael Parenti, a leftist political writer.

The songs "Suicide", "Fucked Reality", "Money" and "Hate Yer State" had all appeared on the band's previous extended play releases. However, the versions featured on this album are different recordings to those included on their E.P.s.

Track listing

("Money", "Fuck America", and "Praise the Sinners" contain audio of Michael Parenti)

Personnel
Musicians:
Stza - guitar and vocals
Ezra - guitar and vocals
Shayne - bass and vocals
Skwert - drums and vocals
Tommy Trujillo - flamenco guitar
Mike Trujillo (Producer, Mixing)
Choking Victim (Producer, Mixing)
Geoff Sykes (Mastering)
Mike Dy (Mixing Assistant)
Phil Kaffel (Engineer)
John Srebalus (Assistant Engineer)
Eric Drooker (Artwork)

References

Choking Victim albums
1999 debut albums
Epitaph Records albums
Political music albums by American artists